"Just Give Me a Reason" is a song recorded by American singer Pink featuring Nate Ruess of the band Fun. The song was chosen as the third single from Pink's sixth studio album, The Truth About Love (2012). Written alongside producer Jeff Bhasker, "Just Give Me a Reason" is a pop ballad about the desire to hold on to a relationship even when it appears to be breaking down.
 
The song received critical acclaim, with many critics deeming the song as the best track on the album. Prior to its release, the song charted in many regions due to strong digital sales, which was the reason for its release. The song attained worldwide success, topping the charts in twenty-one countries including the United States, Austria, Australia, Canada, the Czech Republic, Iceland, Ireland, Lebanon, Italy, Luxembourg, Mexico, Netherlands, New Zealand, Poland, Portugal, Scotland, Slovakia, Sweden, as well as peaking within the top five in more than ten countries as United Kingdom, Belgium, Brazil, Denmark, Finland, France, Israel, Norway, Switzerland and Spain. In the US, it became Pink's fourth number-one single on the Billboard Hot 100. It also became her third number-one on the Billboard Digital Songs chart after "So What" (2008) and "Raise Your Glass" (2010). "Just Give Me a Reason" has sold more than 4 million digital downloads in the United States.

"Just Give Me a Reason" won the Billboard Mid-Year Award for Favorite Hot 100 No. Single, and garnered two Grammy Award nominations for Best Pop Duo/Group Performance and Song of the Year at the 2014 Grammy Awards, where Pink and Nate Ruess performed the song after a trapeze-accompanied rendition of "Try".

The music video for "Just Give Me a Reason" featured Nate Ruess as well as Pink's husband, off-road truck and former motocross racer Carey Hart, in a romantic setting which resembles an artificial marsh. The video won the MTV Video Music Award for Best Collaboration in 2013.

Background

"Just Give Me a Reason" features Nate Ruess from the American band Fun. Originally, it was just a song writing session but Pink realized that she needed someone else to sing the song with her because she thought that it was more of a conversation than a one perspective song. She asked Ruess to sing the song with her as a duet. 
Pink said "I was like, 'no, this is a story, this is a conversation this song' - it needs the other perspective whether it's a guy and a girl, or two girls or two guys. 'I came in and tried to convince him that this was how the conversation was going to go and it was interesting you know, he was like 'I'll just do the demo cos I don't know about duets' and I totally tricked him into doing it, and I am so glad I was able to. 'I think now he's very happy that he did it, I think it's a beautiful song and I'm really, really proud of it.

Nate Ruess told MTV News: "Writing the song was a whole different learning experience and was really fueled by the fact that Alecia [Pink's real name is Alecia Moore] is so strong and independent and so very much herself. At the end of the day it's so hard to argue against her because what she does is always so great.
The song is about the desire to hold on to a relationship even when it appears to be breaking down.

Composition

"Just Give Me a Reason" is a pop ballad written by both artists and produced by Jeff Bhasker, who was also the lead producer for Some Nights, the second album from Ruess' band, fun. "Just Give Me a Reason" starts off with a simple melody played on the piano, as Pink starts to sing the first stanza and chorus, the latter of which introduces drum machines and bass. The second stanza is then sung by Ruess, and the rest of the song is sung as a duet. The song ends with a piano solo, similar to the intro. It has a duration of four minutes and two seconds.

According to the sheet music published on Musicnotes.com, "Just Give Me a Reason" is written in the key of G major with a moderate tempo of 95 beats per minute. Pink and Ruess' vocals span two octaves in the song, from G3 to G5. The verses of the song follow the chord progression G I C Em I C I G, the chorus is G I D7/F# I Em I Bm D7, while the prechorus, the intro, and the outro follow the progression of Em A/C# I D I repeated three times before C G/B I Am, and with a variation into the second chorus.

Critical reception
The song received acclaim from contemporary critics. Jody Rosen from Rolling Stone referred positively to "Just Give Me a Reason" as the best track within the album, "in which Pink dials back the drama, letting the melody and sentiments do their work". Sharing the same opinion, Amy Sciaretto from PopCrush said she liked the "soft" side of Pink and that she and Nate Ruess "fit like a jigsaw puzzle, a lovely yin and yang." Bill Lamb from About.com  said: "The genius behind 'Just Give Me a Reason' is that it is a powerful, well written song that is allowed to shine by a simple, spare Jeff Bhasker production and straightforward vocals from Pink and Nate Ruess of the group Fun. The song lays out the emotions behind a wish for reconciliation in a relationship but doesn't provide easy answers. The simple piano based production ensures that every word is clear and the emotional tone of the voices is heard."

Lewis Corner from Digital Spy said: "As her latest single 'Just Give Me a Reason' demonstrates, Pink isn't afraid to band with pop's current flavour - and in this case it's Fun.'s Nate Ruess. "I let you see the parts of me/ That weren't all that pretty/ And with every touch you fixed them," Pink reveals over a folksy piano line, before she bursts into a heart-warbling chorus. The final result may echo fun.'s own anthemic hits, but Pink never fails to make a song her own, even when sharing the spotlight." MusicOMH said that "Pink's other side – the impassioned songwriter – is showcased on Try, which demonstrates that she has a voice that not enough people give her credit for. Similar territory is trodden in Just Give Me a Reason, a duet with fun.'s lead singer Nate Ruess (which sounds more like a fun. song than a Pink song, funnily enough), but it’s these moments that show Pink at her most formulaic."

Common Sense Media (CSM) said, "Pink, singer from band fun. team up in sweet love tune." Billboard also gave a positive review of the song saying this duet with the band's lead singer Nate Ruess (produced by "We Are Young" helmer Jeff Bhasker) would fit right at home on "Some Nights": "Although it's a little jarring to hear Pink's raw, live vocals paired with Ruess' Auto-Tune, it's ultimately a less-schmaltzy version of those male/female duets found at the end credits of every 80s movie." HitFix said One of the highlights is her duet with fun.'s Nate Ruess, who co-wrote "Just Give Me a Reason".

Chart performance
In the United States, "Just Give Me a Reason" topped the iTunes chart on March 19, 2013, and remained atop the list for more than 10 consecutive days, becoming Pink's third Digital Songs number one hit. In early April, it fell to the runner-up position to Bruno Mars's "When I Was Your Man" only to return to the top two days later and stayed there for the entire month of April 2013. Its success in the digital market was reflected on its Hot 100 position, making it Pink's fourteenth Top 10 hit in the USA during the charting week ending March 30, 2013, then pushing it further to the top to #5 and then to #3, and finally to the top of the chart. The song spent 15 weeks in the top 10. The Truth About Love is therefore Pink's first set to achieve more than two Top 10 hits since Missundaztood. On the issue dated April 27, 2013, it reached number one on the Billboard Hot 100, becoming Pink's fourth chart topper and Nate Ruess' second overall, after "We Are Young" with his band Fun. It also was Pink's longest time spent as a lead artist at number one, as it ruled for three consecutive weeks.
The song is the seventh best-selling song of 2013 with 4,321,000 download copies sold in the United States for the year.

As of January 2014 the song has sold a total of 4,405,000 downloads in the US. With "Just Give Me a Reason" soaring to number one on the Adult Top 40 chart, it became Pink's eighth number one song there and her tenth top ten overall. Pink currently ties the record for most number ones on that chart, with Katy Perry and Maroon 5 with each having eight. "Just Give Me a Reason" also reached number one on both the US Pop Songs, Adult Pop Songs, Adult contemporary chart and Digital Songs.

In Mexico the song has debuted at the number one, it has been certified 3× Platinum, denoting sales of almost 180,000 copies in the country.
 
The song attained worldwide success, topping the charts in 20 countries including the United States, Austria, Czech Republic, Iceland, Ireland, Lebanon, Italy, Luxembourg, Mexico, Netherlands, New Zealand, Poland, Portugal, Scotland, Slovakia, Sweden, Australia, Canada as well as peaking within the top five in more than ten countries as United Kingdom, Belgium (Flandes)(Volonia), Brazil, Denmark, Finland, France, Israel, Norway, Switzerland and Spain.

On the week of October 6, 2012, "Just Give Me a Reason" debuted at number 106 in the US and at number 75 in Canada. That was the same week that the second single of the album ("Try") debuted at number 56. "Just Give Me a Reason" has also debuted at 65 in Switzerland and 168 in France.

In the United Kingdom "Just Give Me a Reason" stayed in the Top 10 for 11 weeks. It has been certified 3× Platinum by the British Phonographic Industry, with sales of almost 800,000 copies in 2013 making it the eighth best-selling song of the year.

In Australia, the song debuted at number six on the week of February 17, 2013, before peaking at one the following week. This makes The Truth About Love Pink's first album to score two number-one singles in the country, the first single being "Blow Me (One Last Kiss)". This is also Nate Ruess's first number-one song but third overall since his band Fun had two songs that went number one. In the Netherlands, the song went to number one on February 23, 2013, marking it Pink's very first Dutch number one song in her 13-year career.
In France, the song went to number seven in March 2013, making "Just Give Me a Reason" Pink's third top-ten song in the country and has sold a total of 119.000 downloads.
In Canada, the song went to number one on April 13, 2013, making Pink's second number-one single in the country after "So What". It has spent seven consecutive weeks at number-one on the Canadian Hot 100, becoming her longest reigning number-one single.  It was the third best-selling song of 2013 in Canada with 499,000 copies sold.

According to the IFPI, by the end of the year, the single had sold 9.9 million copies. The song was the 4th best-selling song of 2013.

Music video

Background and release
The video was directed by Diane Martel and photographed by Jeff Cronenweth. It was filmed in November 2012. Pictures from the video were posted on Twitter. In the pictures, Pink is lying in bed with her husband Carey Hart. Pink was extremely disappointed by the leak, so the photos were deleted immediately after. The official video was released on February 5, 2013. A behind the scenes video was later added to Pink's VEVO channel, where Pink confirms that the video was shot in a Los Angeles swimming pool.

The video won the MTV Video Music Award for Best Collaboration in 2013. The video was nominated for Video of the Year on the People's Choice Awards 2014. As of February 2022, it has received over 1.3 billion views.

Synopsis
The video shows Pink lying on a mattress in the middle of an artificial marsh, with fog surrounding the set and a star-studded background. The video is highly symbolic and its storyline is indirect, with references supporting the song's theme, including a teddy bear, a TV floating on the surface of water, the water itself and a wall made of wood in the background. The scenes include Pink's solo mattress scene, another with Nate Ruess shows the two singers singing the song in a white, blank set, and a third scene showing Pink and her husband Carey Hart embracing and diving.

Lyric video
An official lyric video was published on Pink's official VEVO account in September 2012. It features stars that sparkle in the background. The lyrics shown are sung by both Pink and Ruess.

Credits and personnel
Pink – songwriter, vocals
Nate Ruess – songwriter, vocals
Jeff Bhasker – songwriter, producer, keyboards, synthesizer and music programmer
Anders Mouridsen – guitars
John X. Volaitis – recording at Earthstar Creation Center, Venice, California
Tony Maserati – mixer
Justin Hergett – assistant mixer
James Krausse – assistant mixer

Credits adapted from The Truth About Love album liner notes.

Track listing
 Digital download
 "Just Give Me a Reason" – 4:02

 German CD single
 "Just Give Me a Reason" – 4:02
 "Are We All We Are" (Live from Los Angeles) – 3:32

Charts

Weekly charts

Year-end charts

Decade-end charts

All-time charts

Certifications

Release history

See also

List of best-selling singles
List of best-selling singles in the United States
List of Dutch Top 40 number-one singles of 2013
List of Hot 100 number-one singles of 2013 (Canada)
List of Hot 100 number-one singles of 2013 (U.S.)
List of number-one singles of 2013 (Australia)
List of number-one hits of 2009 (Austria)
List of number-one hits of 2013 (Germany)
List of number-one hits of 2013 (Sweden)
List of number-one hits of 2013 (Switzerland)
List of Billboard Adult Contemporary number ones of 2013

References

Pink (singer) songs
2012 songs
2013 singles
Song recordings produced by Jeff Bhasker
Songs written by Jeff Bhasker
Songs written by Pink (singer)
Male–female vocal duets
Music videos directed by Diane Martel
RCA Records singles
Number-one singles in Australia
Number-one singles in Germany
Number-one singles in Italy
Number-one singles in Lebanon
Number-one singles in New Zealand
Number-one singles in Scotland
Number-one singles in Sweden
Canadian Hot 100 number-one singles
Dutch Top 40 number-one singles
Irish Singles Chart number-one singles
Billboard Hot 100 number-one singles
Pop ballads
Songs written by Nate Ruess
2010s ballads